Śpiewajmy razem. All Together Now was a Polish television musical talent competition based on a British show All Together Now hosted by Mariusz Kałamaga (previously Igor Kwiatkowski) and broadcast on Polsat. The first season premiered on September 5, 2018.

Format
Contestants on the program showcase their skills before a hundred member jury. One juror eventually joins in on the singing for the contestants. Each episode the best ranked contestants pass on to the next round of the competition including the jurors' first place pick and the extra time winner (for which the second and third place winners go). The contestants are fighting to become finalists and to earn a cash prize and to become the winner.

Summary
To date, 2 seasons have been broadcast, as summarised below. A few months later, Polsat announced that they had no plans for a third season.

Episodes
There were eight episodes broadcast in each season.

Jurors
Singer Ewa Farna was the captain of the jury in the first edition, but she was replaced with Beata Kozidrak for the next season. Others involved in the show include Saszan, Nick Sinckler, Ramona Rey, Stanisław Karpiel-Bułecka, Paweł Stasiak, Arkadiusz Kłusowski, Madox, Tabb and Dariusz Kordek.

References

Music competitions in Poland
Polish music television series
2018 Polish television series debuts
Polsat original programming
All Together Now (franchise)
Polish television series based on British television series